Mayuka Thaïs (born September 25, 1979) is an American singer-songwriter, artist, voice over artist, art educator, and edutainer. She is known for her role as a bilingual singer and actress on the popular television program  Shimajiro.

Early life and career beginnings 
Thaïs was born in San Francisco to a Caucasian American mother Teri Suzanne; her late father was Japanese.
 She worked in the edutainment industry as a studio singer, actress, and voice over artist, for bilingual multi-media edutainment products from the age of 5 for Nippon Columbia. For 13 years she honed her acting skills while studying at Aoyama Theatre in the round, bilingual Performing Arts Group, at the National Children's Castle's Aoyama Theatre.  At the age of 10, Thaïs won the Tokyo Metropolitan Government art award. Her notable role came when she became the main singer, actress on a popular children's television show Shimajiro 
 In 2007, Thaïs graduated and received her BFA from Otis College of Art and Design in Los Angeles with HONORS majoring in Fine Arts Painting and A.C.T. (Artists, Community, & Teaching). Thaïs is currently an instructor at Otis College of Art and Design.

Music
At the age of 5, Thaïs recorded a Christmas album Minna De Merry Christmas with multiracial children for Nippon Columbia. To date, Thais has worked on 14 albums and countless singles. In 2004 Thaïs recorded Genki Genki Utaou Nontan's bilingual Christmas album for Nippon Columbia along with her sister Kunimi Andrea, and her mother Teri Suzanne. With the help of contributors on her Pledge Music campaign, her album Tusks & Horns was produced by Geoff Levin of People! in May 2014. Thaïs has shared the stage with artists such as Mayu Wakisaka, The Watanabes, Nesian Mystik, Geoff Levin, and many others.

Art
At the age of 10, Thaïs won the Tokyo Metropolitan Government art award. In 2007, Thaïs's painting of a life-size Asian Elephant was exhibited at the Palos Verdes Art Center as part of a group show The Circus Comes to Town curated by Scott Canty.

Activism
On December 13, 2006, when Thaïs was an art student at Otis College of Art and Design, she took her painting of an elephant in captivity to a town hall meeting to lend her voice to discuss conditions of elephants in captivity. In 2007, Thaïs released her first independent single When Elephants Cry on YouTube to help raise awareness of the plight of Elephants in captivity. She was asked to perform this song at the Comedy Store for a recognition dinner of high-profile celebrities including Jorja Fox, comedian Lily Tomlin and former Los Angeles City Councilman Tony Cardenas and current Congressman. In 2014, she was asked to march for the Global March for Elephants & Rhinos in San Francisco and to sing her song Tusks & Horns at the United Nations Plaza with her producer Geoff Levin on guitar. In 2015, she went on her Tusks & Horns tour and toured Hiroshima, Fukuoka, Kagawa, and Tokyo, Japan. She gave hanga artworkshops for children, art students, and families in hopes of raising and spreading awareness of the plight of endangered Elephants & Rhinos. She also joined in the march for the Global March for Elephants & Rhinos in Tokyo.

Peace song for Hiroshima 
In August 2015, Thaïs performed her song Yamayuri no Kimochi for the 70th war memorial in Hiroshima at the Akioota International Music festival. The song was a collaboration between Thaïs for melody, lyrics by the children of Hiroshima, lyrics made into poetry by poet Arthur Binard, piano by Scott Nagatani. The song has become the official song to commemorate the annual war memorial for the Akioota International Music Festival.

Philanthropy
In 2011, Thaïs launched an indiegogo campaign to raise funds for the children at Atlanta Georgia's Children's Rite Hospital Children's Healthcare of Atlanta (CHOA). She raised $1736 and also created a music video with her song Hope Is My Friend to spread the news of love and hope so that hospitalized children would have Christmas presents.

Art and music non-profit collaborations

Music 
To help disadvantaged youth find their own voices, Thaïs worked with the non-profit program Youth Speak Collective students in the San Fernando Valley to cultivate their songwriting skills for Rockband 101. World renowned drummer percussionist Billy Hawn joined in to help teach, inspire, and arrange music for the students.

Art 
To help raise awareness of the plight of Asian elephants, Thaïs collaborated with a non-profit organization Elemotion, to paint a life-size baby Asian elephant with the students from International School of the Sacred Heart.

Television

In 2016, Thaïs was one of the two finalists on Skin Wars: Fresh Paint episode 2, hosted by RuPaul. A spin-off of the popular TV series Skin Wars specifically for artists who have never body painted before.

Television

Children's television personality

Children's television

Discography

Songs for films

Albums
Independently released:

Studio released:

Singles 
Singles released independently:
 Thanks Santa (1995)
 The Divine (2004)
 When Elephants Cry (2010)
 Hope Is My Friend (2011)
 All We Gotta Give (2011)
 The Great Serengeti (2011)
 Tohorā He Waiata (The Whale Song) (2012)
 Hearts Don't Lie (2013)
 Let the Wind Blow (2014)
 Yamayuri no Kimochi (2015)
 I Will Sing For You (2020)
 The Yamayuri Song (2020)
 Just One More Time (2020)

Released Nippon Columbia:
 Let's Play with Alphabets (2009)
 Sounds of Animals (2009)
 Kaze no Youni (1993)

Music videos 
 Just One More Time (2020)
 I Will Sing For You (2020)
 Yamayuri No Kimochi (2016)
 Let the Wind Blow (2015)
 I Needed You ((ft.Connor Sullivan)) (2014)
 Tusks & Horns (2014)
 Hearts Don't Lie ((ft. Ambient Chameleon)) (2013)
 Hope is My Friend (2012)
 The Great Serengeti (2011)
 All We Gotta Give (2011)
 All Alone at Christmas (2011)
 When Elephants Cry (2007)

Awards

Art

Music

Video interviews and appearances
 "We all Japan No. 10 – Mayuka Thaïs " 2011
 "Mayuka Thaïs Summer Songwriting Workshop for Youth Speak Collective 2011 with Billy Hawn " 2011
 "GLOBAL MARCH FOR ELEPHANTS & RHINOS SF – Musical Medicine with Soleil Dakota " 2014

References

External links 
 Official Mayuka Thais Site
 Mayuka Thaïs IMDB

1979 births
Living people
American folk guitarists
American women singer-songwriters
Songwriters from San Francisco
Singers from San Francisco
Musicians from Los Angeles
Otis College of Art and Design alumni
Guitarists from San Francisco
21st-century American women guitarists
21st-century American guitarists
20th-century American women guitarists
20th-century American guitarists
American musicians of Japanese descent
American women musicians of Japanese descent
American television hosts
American children's musicians
20th-century American women singers
21st-century American women singers
American women television presenters
20th-century American singers
21st-century American singers
Singer-songwriters from California